Hiv (also Romanized as Heave) is a village in Hiv Rural District of the Central District of Savojbolagh County, Alborz province, Iran. At the National Census of 2006, the population of the village was 8,061 in 2,247 households. At the 2016 census, its population was 8,697 in 2,838 households; it is the largest village in its rural district.

References 

Savojbolagh County

Populated places in Alborz Province

Populated places in Savojbolagh County